Tarafdar (spelling variations: Taraphdar, Taraphder, Tarafder) is a Bengali surname.  Literally it means "a person in charge of taraf".

Notable people with this surname include:
Abdus Salam Tarafdar, former MP of Mymensingh-7
Bimal Tarafdar, sprinter
Momtazur Rahman Tarafdar, historian
Rajen Tarafdar, Indian film director from Rajshahi
Salim Uddin Tarafder, MP of Naogaon-3
Sujay Tarafdar, Assam cricketer
Wajed Hossain Tarafdar, former MP of Bogra-6

References

Bengali Muslim surnames
Titles in Bangladesh